Jinseong of Silla (c. 865–897) was the fifty-first ruler of the Korean kingdom, Silla in 887–897. She was also Silla's third and last reigning queen after Seondeok and Jindeok.  Her reign saw the end of Unified Silla and the beginning of the Later Three Kingdoms period. According to her older brother Jeonggang, she was smart by nature and tall like a man.

Family 
Parents
 Father: Gyeongmun of Silla (841–875)
 Grandfather: Kim Gye–myeong (김계명)
 Grandmother: Madam Gwanghwa (광화부인)
 Mother: Queen Munui of the Kim clan (문의왕후 김씨)
Maternal grandfather: Heonan of Silla (헌안왕)
Maternal grandmother: Unknown
Consorts and their respective issue: 
 Kim Wi–Hong (김위홍), son of Kim Gye–myeong (김계명)
Stepson: Yang Jeong (양정)

Life
Jinseong was the daughter of King Gyeongmun and Queen Munui.  The younger sister of Heongang and Jeonggang, she rose to the throne when both of her brothers died without issue. When King Jeonggang was dying in 887, he appointed his sister Jinseong as his heir, justifying the choice of a female monarch by pointing at Seondeok's and Jindeok's successful reigns. Though Seondeok and Jindeok's successful reigns were invoked to help Jinseong secure the throne, Silla's third queen regnant ultimately did not live up to the expectations of her predecessors.

Reign
Accroding to Samguk Sagi,  Jinseong did licentious conduct that bringing attractive men into the palace and committing lewd acts with them. She also carried on an affair with the high commander (Gakgan) Wihong. The Samguk Sagi was written by Confucianists, who held a negative view of female rule, so the precise details therein should perhaps not be taken at face value.

In contrast, according to the records of Choe Chiwon, she was a good-hearted monarch with no greed.

During her reign, public order collapsed. Taxes could no longer be collected and the military conscription system failed.  Taking advantage of this domestic disarray, Yang Gil in the northwest and Gyeon Hwon in the southwest rebelled and founded their own kingdoms.

In 895, Jinseong appointed Heongang's illegitimate son Kim Yo as Crown Prince. On June, 897, she abdicated the throne and later died on December, 897. She was buried to the north of Sajasa temple in Gyeongju.

Legacy
She ordered the first compilation of hyangga works, Samdaemok, to be created.

See also
Unified Silla
Later Three Kingdoms of Korea

References

Sources

Silla rulers
897 deaths
Princesses of Silla
Monarchs who abdicated
Year of birth unknown
Year of birth uncertain
9th-century women rulers
9th-century Korean monarchs
9th-century Korean women